The 2021 Richmond Kickers season was the club's 29th season of existence, their third season in USL League One, and their 17th season in the third tier of American soccer. The Kickers were be led by second-year head coach, Darren Sawatzky, and look to improve on their 4th-place finish in 2020.

Due to the COVID-19 pandemic and the associated vaccination rollout, the season began on April 17, 2021. The season concluded on October 30, 2021. Due to the pandemic, the U.S. Open Cup was truncated and subsequently canceled due to the pandemic. The Kickers finished the USL League One regular season in 5th place, qualifying them for the USL League One Playoffs, making it their first appearance in the playoffs since 2016. There, the Kickers were eliminated in the first round against FC Tucson.

Background 

The 2020 season was significantly impacted by the COVID-19 pandemic. The season, originally slated to begin on March 28, 2020 did not begin until July 25, 2020. The season originally was slated to end on September 30, 2020 but concluded on October 24, 2020. The 28-match season was abbreviated to 16 matches, and the playoffs were reduced from a four-team playoff, to a single game championship. During the truncated season, the Kickers had a good turn of fortune, finishing fourth in the league table, and having a winning a record. It was the Kickers' best regular season performance since 2014. Despite the record, the club on the final day of the season failed to reach the USL Championship Game after losing at home to Chattanooga. Striker, Emiliano Terzaghi, scored 10 goals during the season, which was the best performance by a striker for the Kickers since Yudai Imura in 2016. Terzaghi had a 0.63 goals per game average, which was the best performance by a striker for Richmond since Robert Ssejjemba in 2006.

On October 30, 2020, Matt Spear stepped down as the club's president to focus on family reasons. Spear had been the club's president since 2019.

Transfers

Transfers in

Transfers out

Competitive

Exhibitions

USL League One

Standings

Results by matchday

Match results

U.S. Open Cup 

Due to the COVID-19 pandemic, only one team from USL League One (league champions), qualified for the 2021 U.S. Open Cup. However in July 2021, the Open Cup was canceled.

USL-1 Playoffs

Statistics

Appearances and goals

Numbers after plus–sign (+) denote appearances as a substitute.

Top scorers
{| class="wikitable" style="font-size: 95%; text-align: center;"
|-
!width=30|Rank
!width=30|Position
!width=30|Number
!width=175|Name
!width=75|
!width=75|
!width=75|
!width=75|Total
|-
|rowspan="3"| 1 || FW || 15 ||align="left"|  Oalex Anderson || 1 || 0 || 0 || 1
|-
| MF || 17 ||align="left"|  Jonathan Bolanos || 1 || 0 || 0 || 1
|-
| DF || 2 ||align="left"|  Juan Pablo Monticelli || 1 || 0 || 0 || 1
|-

Top assists
{| class="wikitable" style="font-size: 95%; text-align: center;"
|-
!width=30|Rank
!width=30|Position
!width=30|Number
!width=175|Name
!width=75|
!width=75|
!width=75|
!width=75|Total
|-
| 1 || MF || 6 ||align="left"| Hernán González || 1 || 0 || 0 || 1
|-

Disciplinary record
{| class="wikitable" style="text-align:center;"
|-
| rowspan="2" !width=15|
| rowspan="2" !width=15|
| rowspan="2" !width=120|Player
| colspan="3"|USL1
| colspan="3"|USL1 Playoffs
| colspan="3"|U.S. Open Cup
| colspan="3"|Total
|-
!width=34; background:#fe9;|
!width=34; background:#fe9;|
!width=34; background:#ff8888;|
!width=34; background:#fe9;|
!width=34; background:#fe9;|
!width=34; background:#ff8888;|
!width=34; background:#fe9;|
!width=34; background:#fe9;|
!width=34; background:#ff8888;|
!width=34; background:#fe9;|
!width=34; background:#fe9;|
!width=34; background:#ff8888;|
|-
| 6 || MF ||align="left"|  Zacarías Morán || 1 || 0 || 0 || 0 || 0 || 0 || 0 || 0 || 0 || 1 || 0 || 0
|-
| 17 || MF ||align="left"|  Jonathan Bolanos || 1 || 0 || 0 || 0 || 0 || 0 || 0 || 0 || 0 || 1 || 0 || 0
|-
!colspan="3"|Total !! 2 !! 0 !! 0 !! 0 !! 0 !! 0 !! 0 !! 0 !! 0 !! 2 !! 0 !! 0

References

Richmond Kickers seasons
Richmond Kickers
Richmond Kickers
Richmond Kickers
Kickers